De Volta Ao Planeta Dos Mutantes is a two disc best of compilation that includes popular and lesser known tracks from Os Mutantes first five albums, O A e o Z, Tecnicolor, and A Banda Tropicalista do Duprat by Rogério Duprat which includes a cover of The Beatles' "Lady Madonna". The album also includes a few previously unreleased tracks.

Track listing

References

Os Mutantes albums
2006 compilation albums
Universal Records compilation albums